The Western Water Polo Association (WWPA) is a single sport intercollegiate college athletic conference sponsoring men's and women's water polo. The WWPA is affiliated with the NCAA, and includes 15 member institutions, mostly in California, with one institution each in Colorado, Illinois, and West Virginia and two in Erie, Pennsylvania. The league has eight teams in its men's league and nine in its women's league, with only Fresno Pacific and UC San Diego fielding teams for both sexes in the WWPA. The three easternmost schools, Gannon, Mercyhurst, and Salem, also field teams for both men and women, but only the women's teams are in the WWPA, with the men's teams instead playing in the Collegiate Water Polo Association.

The WWPA members play a regular season of conference and non-conference games, followed by a championship tournament at the conclusion of both the men's and women's seasons, with the winner earning the league's automatic bid to the NCAAs.

Members
NCAA water polo is a fall sport for men and a spring sport for women. For women's members, the year of joining is the calendar year before the first season of competition. For men's members, the year of departure is the calendar year after the final season of competition. Departing members are highlighted in pink. All four departing men's members will leave in 2023 when the West Coast Conference, full-time home to Loyola Marymount and Santa Clara, begins sponsoring men's water polo.

Men's teams

Women's teams

Former members

References

External links

Water polo in the United States
NCAA conferences